An agent-general is the representative in cities abroad of the government of a Canadian province or an Australian state and, historically, also of a British colony in Jamaica, Nigeria, Canada, Malta, South Africa, Australia or New Zealand and subsequently, of a Nigerian region. Australia's and Canada's federal governments are represented by high commissions, as are all Commonwealth national governments today.

In the 18th and 19th centuries, a growing number of British colonies appointed agents in Great Britain and Ireland and occasionally elsewhere in Europe to promote immigration to the colonies. Eventually, agents-general were appointed by some colonies to represent their commercial, legal, and diplomatic interests in Britain and to the British government and Whitehall. They were appointed, and their expenses and salaries provided, by the governments of the colonies they represented.

Starting in 1886, Quebec and the federal Canadian government also appointed agents-general to Paris. The first, Hector Fabre, was dispatched by the province of Quebec but was asked by the federal government to represent all of Canada. He and his successor, Philippe Roy, continued to represent both Quebec City and Ottawa in France until 1912 when the federal government asked Roy to resign his Quebec position to avoid conflicts of interest. Canadian provinces have also appointed agents-general (called delegates-general by Quebec beginning in the 1970s) to other countries and major cities.

Following a military coup in Nigeria in 1966, the federal system was abolished, and the posts of the agents-general of Nigerian regions in London were subsumed in the Nigerian High Commission.

By the 1990s, some Australian state governments regarded the office of their agent-general in London as a costly anachronism, even for promoting tourism and investment, and have since been closed and subsumed into the Australian High Commission. The majority of Australian states continue to have agents-general in London, but operate from Australia House rather than maintain separate premises.

Many Canadian provinces similarly are no longer represented by an agent-general, although Quebec continues to have a Government Office in London and in several other cities around the world. Ontario, Alberta, Saskatchewan, and Manitoba have representatives who work out of the Canadian Embassy in Washington, DC.

Australia

Agents-general for New South Wales

Agents-general for Queensland

Agents-general for South Australia
 Gregory Seale Walters, 1856–1865
 Francis Dutton, 1865–1877
 Arthur Blyth, 1877–1891
 John Cox Bray, 1892–1894
 Thomas Playford II, 1894–1898
 Sir John Cockburn, 1898–1901
 Henry Allerdale Grainger, 1901–1905
 John Jenkins, 1905–1908
 Andrew Kirkpatrick, 1909–1914
 Sir Frederick William Young, 1915–1918
 Sir Edward Lucas, 1918–1925
 John Price, 1925–1928
 Sir Henry Barwell, 1928–1933
 Lionel Hill, 1933–1934
 Sir Charles McCann, 1934–1951
 Alfred Greenham, (in 1959?)
 Malcolm Pearce, 1961–1966
 Raymond Charles Taylor, 1971–1974
 Geoff Walls, 1985?–1998
 Maurice de Rohan, 1998–2006
 Bill Muirhead, 2007–2021
 David Ridgway, 2021–present

Agents-general for Tasmania
 Hon Adye Douglas (later Sir, Kt), 1886–1887
 Sir Arthur Blyth (acting), 1887–1888
 James Arndell Youl CMG (later Sir, KCMG) (acting), 1888
 Hon Edward Braddon, (later Right Hon Sir, PC KCMG), 1888–1893
 Sir Robert Herbert, 1893–1896
 Sir Andrew Clarke (acting), 1896
 Sir Westby Perceval, 1896–1898
 Sir Andrew Clarke (acting), 1898–1899
 Hon Sir Philip Oakley Fysh, KCMG, 1899–1901
 Sir Andrew Clarke (acting), 1901
 Hon Alfred Dobson, CMG, 1901–1908
 Sir John McCall, KCMG, Kt., 1909–1919
 Alfred Henry Ashbolt (later Sir, Kt), 1919–1924
 Lieut.-Colonel R. Eccles Snowden (later Sir, Kt), 1924–1930
 Darcy W. Addison, CMG, ISO, MVO, 1930–1931
 Herbert W. Ely, ISO (acting), 1931–1937
 Hon Sir Claude Ernest Weymouth James, Kt, 1937–1950
 Sir Eric E. von Bibra, Kt, OBE 1950–1958
 Hon Sir Alfred J White, Kt 1959–1971
 Royce R. Neville, 1971–1978
 Hon Bill Neilson AC, 1978–1981

Agents-general for Victoria
 Hugh Culling Eardley Childers, 1857–1858
 Charles Pasley, 1864–1867 (acting)
 George Frederic Verdon, 1867–1872
 Hugh Culling Eardley Childers, 1872–1873
 James McCulloch, 1873 (acting from January to April)
 Archibald Michie, 1873–1879
 Charles Pasley, 1880–1882 (acting)
 Robert Murray Smith, 1882–1886
 Graham Berry, 1886–1891
 James Munro, 1892–1893
 Duncan Gillies, 1893–1897
 Andrew Clarke, 1897–1902 (and for Tasmania)
 John William Taverner, 1903–1913
 Peter McBride, 1913–1922
 John McWhae, 1922–1924
 George Fairbairn, 1924–1927
 Walter Leitch, 1929–1933
 Richard Linton, 1933–1936
 Murray Bourchier, 1936–1937
 Albert Louis Bussau, 1938–1944
 Norman Angus Martin, 1945–1950
 John Henry Lienhop, 1950–1956
 William Watt Leggatt, 1956– 1964
 Sir Horace Petty, 1964–1969
 Sir Murray Porter, 1970–1976
 Sir John Rossiter 1976–1979
 The Hon Joseph Anstice Rafferty 1979-1983
 Ian Haig, 1983–1985
 Kenneth Andrew Finnin, 1985–1988
 Ian Haig, 1988–1989
 Ken Crompton, 1993-1996
 Alan Brown, 1996–2000
 Peter Hansen, 2000–2004
 David Buckingham, 2004–2009
 Sally Capp, 2009–2012
 Geoffrey Conaghan, 2013–2016
 Ken Ryan AM, 2017–2020
 Tim Dillon, 2020-present

Agents-general for Western Australia
 Hon Septimus Burt KC, 1891–1892 (Acting)
 Hon Sir Malcolm Fraser, 1892–1898
 Hon Sir Edward Wittenoom, 1898–1901
 Hon Sir Henry Lefroy, 1901–1904
 Hon Sir Walter James, 1904–1907
 Hon Sir Cornthwaite Rason, 1907–1911
 Hon Sir Newton Moore, 1911–1917
 Hon Sir James Connolly, 1917–1923
 Hon Sir Hal Colebatch, 1923–1927
 Hon William Angwin, 1927–1933
 Hon Sir Hal Colebatch, 1933–1939
 Hon Michael Troy, 1939–1947
 Hon William Kitson, 1947–1952
 Hon James Dimmitt, 1953–1957
 Hon Ernest Hoar, 1957–1965
 Hon Gerald Wild, 1965–1971
 Hon Sir Stewart Bovell, 1971–1974
 Jim Richards, 1975–1978
 Les Slade, 1978–1982
 Ron Douglas, 1982–1986
 Hon Ron Davies, 1986–1990
 David Fischer, 1990–1992
 Gary Stokes, 1992–1994
 Bill Hassell, 1994–1996
 Hon Clive Griffiths, 1997–2001
 Robert Fisher, 2001–2005
 Noel Ashcroft, 2005–2008
 Dr. Kerry Sanderson, 2008–2012
 Kevin Skipworth, 2012–2015
 John Atkins, 2015–2018
 Commodore Michael Deeks CSC RAN Rtd, 2018–2021
 John Langoulant, 2021-present

Canada

Agents-general for Canada
to the United Kingdom
 Edward Jenkins, MP for Dundee (1874–1876)
 William Annand (1876–1878)
to France
 Hector Fabre (1886–1910)
 Philippe Roy (1911–1912)

Agents-general for Alberta
 John Alexander Reid (Great War)
 Herbert Greenfield (1927–1931)
 R. A. McMullen (circa 1966)
 James McKibben (1980s)
 Mary LeMessurier (1986–1992)

Agents-general for British Columbia
 Gilbert Malcolm Sproat (1872–1876)
 Thomas Stahlschmidt
 Henry Coppinger Beeton (1893–1895)
 Forbes George Vernon (1895–1898) 
 William Walter (1898–1901)
 John Herbert Turner (1901–1915)
 Sir Richard McBride (1915–1917)
 Frederick Coate Wade (1917–1925)
 Frederick Arthur Pauline (1925–1931)
 Frederick Parker Burden (1931–1934)
 W. A. McAdam (1934–1958)
 B. M. Hoffmeister (1958–1961) 
 J. V. Fishei (1961–1964)
 Earle Cathers Westwood (1964–1968)
 Rear Admiral M. G. Stirling (1968–1975) 
 R. M. Strachan (1975–1977) 
 L. J. Wallace (1977–1980)
 WR. Smart (Acting) (1980)
 A. H. Hart (1981–1987) 
 Garde B. Gardom (1987–1992)
 Mark Willson Rose (1992–1995)
 Paul William King (Acting) (1995–2002)

Agents-general for Manitoba
 Anthony John McMillan
 R. Murray Armstrong (1955–1963)

As it was difficult to compete with larger provinces like Ontario and Quebec, the province of Manitoba decided to leave trade promotion to the federal government and accordingly recalled their agent-general in 1965 without appointing a replacement.

Agents-general for New Brunswick
 Frederick W. Sumner (1915–)

Agents-general for Nova Scotia
 Joshua Maugher (1761–1768)
 William Annand (1878–1887)
 John Howard (1892–1929)
 Miss Jean Iris Howard (Acting, 1929–1930s)
 Charles Arthur Richardson (1969–1972)
 John Elvin Shaffner (1973–1976)
 Rear Admiral Desmond Piers (1977–1979)
 Donald MacKeen Smith (1980–?)

Agents-general for Ontario
 to the United Kingdom 
 Southworth (1908–?)
 Richard Reid (1913–1916) Died in office
 Brigadier-General Manley R. Sims (1918–1920)
 G. C. Creelman (1920–1921)
 William C. Noxon (1921–1934)
 vacant (1934–1944)
 James S. P. Armstrong (1944–1967)
 Allan Rowan-Legg (1968–1972)
 Ward Cornell (1972–1978)
 W. Ross DeGeer (1978–1985)
 Thomas Leonard Wells (1985–1992)
 Robert Nixon (1992–1994)
Sophia Arvanitis (2021-present)

to Asia-Pacific
 Tim (Thomas E.) Armstrong (1986-1990)

to France
 Patrick J. Lavelle (1981-1983)
 Adrienne Clarkson (1983–1988)

to Japan
 Robin Sears (1990–1994)

to New York City
 Carlton Masters (1992)

Agents-general for Prince Edward Island
 Harrison Watson (1902–?)

Agents-general for Quebec

Quebec uses the title agent-general or delegate-general. In 1936, legislation was passed by the government of Maurice Duplessis closing all Quebec government offices abroad. The government of Adélard Godbout repealed the legislation and opened an office in New York City in 1940. When Duplessis returned to power in 1944, his government retained the New York City office and its agent-general but opened no others. In the early 1960s, the government of Jean Lesage began to open additional offices abroad appointing in Paris (1961), London (1962), Rome and Milan (1965) and subsequent governments opened offices in Chicago (1969), Boston, Lafayette, Dallas and Los Angeles (1970), Munich and Berlin (1971), Brussels (1972), Atlanta (1977), Washington (1978), Mexico City and Tokyo (1980), Beijing and Santiago (1998), Shanghai and Barcelona (1999), Mumbai (2007), São Paulo (2008) and Moscow (2012). In 1971, the title of agent-general was officially changed to delegate-general although previous title is still often used, particularly for the government's representative to London.

As of 2016, the government of Quebec has delegates-general (agents-general) in London, Brussels, Mexico City, New York, Paris, and Tokyo; delegates to Boston, Chicago, Los Angeles, and Rome, and offices headed by directors offering more limited services in Barcelona, Beijing, Dakar, Hong Kong, Mumbai, São Paulo, Shanghai, Stockholm, and Washington. In addition, there are the equivalent of Honorary consuls, titled antennes, in Atlanta, Berlin, Houston, Qingdao, Seoul, and California's Silicon Valley.

 to the United Kingdom
 Jean-Marie-Joseph-Pantaléon Pelletier (1911–1924)
 Louis-Joseph Lemieux (1925–1936)
 vacant (1936–1961)
 Hugues Lapointe (1961–1966)
 Guy Roberge (1966–1971)
 Jean Fournier (1971–1977)
 Gilles Loiselle (1977–1983)
 Patrick Hyndman (1983–1987)
 Reed Scowen (1987–1992)
 Harold Mailhot (1992–1995)
 Richard Guay (1995–2000)
 Daniel Audet (2000–2003)
 George R. MacLaren (2003–2008)
 Pierre Boulanger (2008–2012)
 Stéphane Paquet (2012–2014)
 Christos Sirros (2014–2017)
John A. Coleman (2017–2019)
Pierre Gabriel Côté (2019–present)

 
to France

 Hector Fabre (1882–1910)
 Philippe Roy (1911–1912)
 vacant (1912–1961)
 Charles Lussier (1961–1964)
 Jean Chapdelaine (delegate general) (1964–1976)
 François Cloutier (delegate general) (1976–1977)
 Jean Deschamps (delegate general) (1977–1979)
 Yves Michaud (delegate general) (1979–1984)
 Louise Beaudoin (delegate general) (1984–1985)
 Claude Pug (delegate general) (1985–1986)
 Jean-Louis Roy (delegate general) (1986–1990)
 Marcel Bergeron (delegate general) (1990–1991)
 André Dufour (delegate general) (1991–1994)
 Claude Pug (delegate general) (1994–1995)
 Marcel Masse (delegate general) (1995–1997)
 Michel Lucier (delegate general) (1997–2000)
 Clément Duhaime (delegate general) (2000–2005)
 Wilfrid-Guy Licari (delegate general) (2005–2010)
 Michel Robitaille (delegate general) (2010–present)
 to Belgium
 Godfroy Langlois (1914–1928)
 vacant (1936–1972)
 Jean Deschamps (1972–1977)
 Jean Chapdelaine (chargé des affaires) (1977)
 André Patry (1978)
 Jean-Marc Léger (1978–1981)
 Jean-Paul L'Allier (1981–1984)
 Jean Tardif (1984–1986)
 Claude Roquet (1986–1989)
 Pierre Lorrain (1989–1993)
 Gérard P. Latulippe (1993–1996)
 Denis de Belleval (1996–1999)
 Richard Guay (1999–2001)
 Nicole Stafford (2001–2004)
 Christos Sirros (2004–2014)
 Michel Audet (delegate general) (2014–present)
 to Germany (Munich)
 Claude Trudelle (delegate general) (as of 2016)
 to Japan
 Claire Deronzier (delegate general) (2013–present)
 to Mexico 
 Christiane Pelchat (delegate general) (2011–2014)
 Eric R. Mercier (delegate general) (as of 2016)
 to the United States (New York City)
 Charles Chartier (1940–1967)
 Jean-Marc Roy (1967–1969)
 Général Jean V. Allard (1969–1971)
 Guy Poliquin (1971–1977)
 Marcel Bergeron (delegate general) (1977–1980)
 Richard Pouliot (delegate general) (1980–1982)
 Raymond Gosselin (delegate general) (1982–1984)
 Rita Dionne-Marsolais (delegate general) (1984–1987)
 Léo Paré (delegate general) (1987–1992)
 Reed Scowen (delegate general) (1992–1994)
 Kevin Drummond (delegate general) (1994–1997)
 David Levine (delegate general) (1997–1998)
 Diane Wilhelmy (delegate general) (1998–2002)
 Michel Robitaille (delegate general) (2002–2007)
 Bruno Fortier (delegate general) (2007–2008)
 Robert Keating (delegate general) (2008–2009)
 John Parisella (delegate general) (2009–2012)
 André Boisclair (delegate general) (2012–2013)
 Dominique Poirier (delegate general) (2013–2014)
 Jean-Claude Lauzon (delegate general) (2014–present)

Agents-general for Saskatchewan
 Graham Spry (1946–1968)
 Edward Arthur Boden (1973–1977)
 Merv Johnson (1977–1983)
 Robert Larter
 Paul Emile Rousseau (1986–1991)

Jamaica
Source: Historic Jamaica.
 1664–1666: Sir James Modyford
 1682–?: Sir Charles Lyttelton
 William Beeston
 1688: Ralph Knight
 Gilbert Heathcote
 1693–1704: Bartholomew Gracedieu
 1714: P. Marsh
 1725: Alexander Stephenson
 1725–1726: Edward Charlton
 1728–1733: Charles de la Foy
 1733: John Gregory
 1733–1757: John Sharpe
 1757–1762: Lovell Stanhope (MP for Winchester)
 1764–1795: Stephen Fuller
 1795–1803: Robert Sewell
 1803–1812: Edmund Pusey Lyon
 1812–1831: George Hibbert
 1831–1845: William Burge
 1845 Office abolished

Malta
With the granting of responsible self-government to Malta in 1921, a proposal of the government of Lord Strickland to appoint an agent-general to "encourage the migration of Maltese to the Northern Territory and north-west Australia" was presented to the parliament. Strickland, who was Governor of Western Australia (1909–1913) suggested former Colonial Secretary and Agent-General of Western Australia in London, Sir James Connolly. The position was discontinued with the suspension of the constitution in November 1933 and was replaced by a Trade Commissioner, who was in turn replaced by a Commissioner-General in 1947.

South Africa
Prior to the creation of the Union of South Africa in 1910, the four constituent British colonies of southern Africa all sent agents-general to London, coinciding with the establishment of responsible self-government in each colony.

Agent-general for the Orange River Colony
The Orange River Colony sent an agent-general from 1908 until the creation of the Union of South Africa in 1910. Brounger was a former Director of the Orange Free State Railways.

Agent-general for the Transvaal Colony
The Transvaal Colony sent an agent-general from the establishment of responsible self-government in 1907 until the creation of the Union of South Africa in 1910. Solomon then served as the first South African High Commissioner in London from 1910 to 1913.

Agents-general for the Cape Colony
The Cape Colony sent separate agents-general until the creation of the Union of South Africa in 1910.

Agents-general for Natal
The Colony of Natal sent separate agents-general until the creation of the Union of South Africa in 1910.

New Zealand

After 1905 the position of Agent-General was replaced by that of High Commissioner, with the final Agent-General becoming the first High Commissioner.

Nigerian regions

The First Nigerian agents-general to the United Kingdom were appointed in December 1959 and include:
 Northern Region: Alhaji Sa'adu Alanamu
 Eastern Region: Jonah Chinyere Achara
 Western Region: Chief Akitoye Emmanuel Coker 
The last Nigerian Agent-Generals in London were:
 Northern Region: Baba Gana
 Eastern Region: A. Ekukinam-Bassey
 Western Region: Prince Delphus Adebayo Odubanjo
 Mid-West Region: Josiah A.P. Oki

Notes

Bibliography
 
 Australian Dictionary of Biography

External links
 Australian High Commission Website
 Quebec Government Office in London
 Victorian Government Agent-General
 Office of the Agent-General – South Australia
 Agent-General (UK) – Trade & Investment Queensland

Governance of the British Empire
Diplomats by role
British colonial officials